Sanmenxiaxi (Sanmenxia West) railway station is a station on Longhai railway in Shanzhou District, Sanmenxia, Henan.

History
The station was established in 1924.

The station was formerly known as Shanxian railway station. It was changed to the current name in 1986.

References

Railway stations in Henan
Stations on the Longhai Railway
Railway stations in China opened in 1924